Herbert Huntington (July 27, 1799 – September 13, 1851) was a farmer, merchant and politician in Nova Scotia. He represented Shelburne County from 1830 to 1836 and Yarmouth County from 1836 to 1850 in the Nova Scotia House of Assembly.

Early life
He was born in Yarmouth, Nova Scotia, the son of Miner Huntington, a Connecticut loyalist, and Martha Walker.

Career
Huntington served with the militia during the War of 1812 and taught school for a time. He also served as a land surveyor like his father.

During the War of 1812, Huntington served with the Yarmouth militia to repel the landing of an American ship. He taught school in Yarmouth for a time, served as a militia captain, and in 1822 became the first librarian of the Yarmouth Book Society. He was a farmer and also owned and held shares in several ships.

Political career
He served as a member of the province's Executive Council for a short time in 1838. In 1848, he was named a minister without portfolio and later financial secretary for the province.

Resignation and death
Huntingdon resigned his seat in the assembly at the end of 1850 due to poor health. He died in Yarmouth nine months later at the age of 52.

Personal life
In 1830, Huntington married Rebecca Russell (née Pinkney).

References 

1799 births
1851 deaths
Nova Scotia pre-Confederation MLAs
People from Yarmouth, Nova Scotia